Acrolophus contubernalis is a moth of the family Acrolophidae. It is found in Brazil.

References

contubernalis
Moths described in 1923